Cecilia of Sweden (22 June 1807 in Stockholm – 27 January 1844 in Oldenburg) was a composer, a Swedish princess by birth, and Grand Duchess of Oldenburg by marriage. She was the daughter of King Gustav IV Adolf of Sweden and Frederica of Baden.

Biography 
After birth, she was raised under the supervision of the royal governess Charlotte Stierneld.  The youngest of four children, Cecilia left Sweden in 1810 with her family after her father was deposed as king of Sweden by the Coup of 1809. She was raised in her mother's home country, the Grand Duchy of Baden (Germany). After her parents were divorced in 1812, she was raised mainly by her grandmother Amalie of Hesse-Darmstadt in Bruchsal.

She met Augustus, Grand Duke of Oldenburg in 1830, and after an hour's conversation, the marriage was decided. She went to her brother in Vienna, where her wedding took place in the presence of the Austrian Emperor Francis I. She relocated to the city of Oldenburg in June 1831.

Cecilia had an interest in culture. As Grand Duchess of Oldenburg she composed the melody of a hymn for Oldenburg. The hymn was later added with lyrics by Theodor von Kobbe and named ‘Heil dir, o Oldenburg’. In 1833, Cecila supported the founding of the city's first theatre, which today is the Oldenburgisches Staatstheater. She was, however, never known to be close to the population in Oldenburg, where she lived a life confined to the circles of the court. A bridge, a square and a road are named after her, as well as a school. In honour of the late Cecilia, the locality Cäciliengroden at the Jade Bight near Wilhelmshaven (later incorporated into Sande in Frisia) was named after her.

Cecilia died at the age of 36 from puerperal fever, a few days after giving birth to her third child Elimar. She was buried in the Ducal Mausoleum in the Churchyard of St. Gertrude (St. Gertrudenkirchhof / Gertrudenfriedhof) in the city of Oldenburg. Her sister Amalia Maria Charlotta was also buried there.

Marriage
She married Augustus, Grand Duke of Oldenburg (1783–1853) on 5 May 1831 in Vienna. Both being members of the House of Holstein-Gottorp and descendants of Christian August of Holstein-Gottorp, Prince of Eutin, they were distant cousins. It was Augustus' third marriage.

They had three sons:

 Alexander Friedrich Gustav (16 June 1834 – 6 June 1835)
 Nikolaus Friedrich August (15 February 1836 – 30 April 1837)
 Anton Günther Friedrich Elimar (23 January 1844 – 17 October 1895)

Ancestry

References 

 This article is partially based on its equivalent on Spanish Wikipedia
 Gisela Niemöller: Die Engelinnen im Schloß. Eine Annäherung an Cäcilie, Amalie und Friederike von Oldenburg. Isensee, Oldenburg 1997,

Further reading
 

|-

House of Holstein-Gottorp
Cecilia 1807
Daughters of kings
Disinherited European royalty
Grand Duchesses of Oldenburg
Deaths in childbirth
1807 births
1844 deaths
Burials at the Ducal Mausoleum, Gertrudenfriedhof (Oldenburg)
Swedish women composers
Swedish composers
19th-century composers
People from Stockholm
19th-century women composers
Royal reburials